Empire of Light is a 2022 British romantic drama film.

Empire of Light may also refer to:

Empire of Light (album), by Devil Sold His Soul, 2012
The Empire of Light, a succession of paintings by René Magritte